Boy Bitten by a Crayfish is a lost painting by Caravaggio that is known thanks to several copies. The copy that has always been considered the most faithful belongs to the Musée des Beaux-Arts of Strasbourg, France. Its inventory number is 1285.

The Strasbourg painting has long been attributed to an anonymous Caravaggista known as Pensionante del Saraceni, although another version of the painting, which appeared on the art market in 2013, is closer to the technique of that painter, which is, in effect, "much softer and cooler" than Caravaggio's. The Strasbourg version, the closest to Caravaggio's own style, is supposedly based on an original that was probably painted around 1593. Earlier attributions had suggested the authorship of Mattia Preti, but this could never be substantiated.

The Strasbourg Boy Bitten by a Crayfish had formerly belonged to the Comte de Pourtalès Collection; it was sold in Paris on 27 March 1865 but at some point in time returned to the heirs of the count De Pourtalès, for it was gifted to the museum in 1931 by Mrs. Bérard de Loÿs Chandieu, heiress of the Château de Pourtalès through her mother.

References 

Paintings in the collection of the Musée des Beaux-Arts de Strasbourg
1590s paintings
Renaissance paintings
Italian paintings
Oil on canvas paintings